Cravanzana is a comune (municipality) in the Province of Cuneo in the Italian region Piedmont, located about  southeast of Turin and about  northeast of Cuneo.

Cravanzana borders the following municipalities: Arguello, Bosia, Cerreto Langhe, Feisoglio, Lequio Berria, and Torre Bormida.

References

Cities and towns in Piedmont